Starcom is a global media and communications agency that was founded in Chicago. The company provides a wide range of advertising and marketing services to clients, including media planning and buying, digital strategy, data and analytics, and content creation. With offices in major cities around the world, Starcom works with clients in a variety of industries to help them build their brands and connect with consumers through meaningful, relevant and engaging experiences. Starcom is a part of Publicis Groupe, one of the world's largest advertising and communications holding companies.

History 
Starcom was founded in Chicago in 1971 as a media planning and buying agency. From the beginning, the company focused on providing innovative and effective media solutions for its clients. Over the years, Starcom expanded its offerings to include a wide range of advertising and marketing services, including digital strategy, data and analytics, and content creation.

In the 1990s and 2000s, as technology and media continued to evolve, Starcom continued to adapt and innovate. The company was an early adopter of digital media, and was among the first to recognize the potential of the internet and mobile devices as advertising platforms. Starcom also made strategic acquisitions and partnerships that helped the company to expand its reach and capabilities.

In recent years, Starcom has become known for its innovative approach to advertising and marketing, leveraging data and technology to create personalized, relevant and engaging experiences for consumers. The company has a strong focus on understanding and leveraging consumer insights, and is constantly exploring new ways to use data and technology to deliver results for its clients.

Today, Starcom is a global media and communications agency with a presence in major cities around the world. The company is a part of Publicis Groupe, one of the world's largest advertising and communications holding companies, and works with clients in a wide range of industries to help them build their brands and connect with consumers. Through its commitment to innovation, creativity and results, Starcom has become one of the most respected and trusted names in the advertising and marketing industry.

Resources 
SMG Performance Marketing: Full-service media agency.

LiquidThread: branded entertainment content and on-ground activation specialists.

MRY: Full-service digital creative agency.

Relevant24: Real-time content agency creating multi-media branded content marketing  

Data & Analytics:

Extech: Offers new marketplace products and services.

SPORTS at SMG: Sports and event marketing, including strategy, planning, rights acquisition and activation to SMG clients.

VivaKi: Programmatic advertising and media buying

IP Pixel: digital creative agency. IP Pixel was founded in 2003 by Nicholas Yecke, John Rafferty, and Jen Schreiber then members of Starcom IP - Starcom WorldWide, held by the Publicis Groupe. In 2007, Publicis restructured Pixel into a fully integrated part of its Starcom MediaVest Group.

Employees and Locations 
SMG employs roughly 7,000 people in 49 locations worldwide.

References

Publicis Groupe
Marketing companies established in 2000
Companies based in Chicago
Advertising agencies of the United States